This is a list of films produced in 1975 by the Ollywood film industry based in Bhubaneshwar and Cuttack.

A-Z

References

1975
Ollywood
Films, Ollywood
1970s in Orissa